Kurvelesh may refer to:
Kurvelesh (region), a region in southern Albania
Kurvelesh, Tepelenë, an administrative unit in the municipality of Tepelenë, Albania